The 1979 European Athletics Indoor Championships were held in Vienna, the capital city in Austria, on 24 and 25 February 1979. It was the second time the championships had been held in that city.

Medal summary

Men

Women

Medal table

Participating nations

 (13)
 (5)
 (10)
 (11)
 (2)
 (17)
 (12)
 (10)
 (10)
 (7)
 (3)
 (16)
 (4)
 (2)
 (13)
 (1)
 (4)
 (27)
 (5)
 (4)
 (6)
 (1)
 (16)
 (9)

References
 Results - men at GBRathletics.com
 Results - women at GBRathletics.com
 EAA

 
European Athletics Indoor Championships
European Indoor Championships
European Athletics Indoor Championships
Sports competitions in Vienna
International athletics competitions hosted by Austria
1970s in Vienna
European Athletics Indoor Championships